The Herbst Stutenpreis is a Group 3 flat horse race in Germany open to thoroughbred fillies and mares aged three years or older. It is run at Hanover over a distance of 2,200 metres (about 1 mile and 3 furlongs), and it is scheduled to take place each year in September or October.

History
The event was originally held at Frankfurt, and it used to be called the Frankfurter Stutenpreis. It was established in 1999, and was initially contested over 2,150 metres. It was given Listed status in 2000, and promoted to Group 3 level in 2004.

The race was switched to Düsseldorf and extended to 2,200 metres in 2008. It returned to Frankfurt with its previous length in 2009.

The distance of the race was restored to 2,200 metres in 2010. That year's edition was staged at Düsseldorf, and subsequent runnings were held at Cologne (2011) and Hanover (2012).

The Herbst Stutenpreis has been run under various titles since leaving Frankfurt. It was known as the Grosser Preis Jungheinrich-Gabelstapler in 2012.

Records
Most successful horse (2 wins):
 La Dancia – 2006, 2007

Leading jockey (3 wins):
 Andrasch Starke – Goathemala (2008), Norderney (2009), Walkaway (2021)

Leading trainer (4 wins):
 Peter Rau – Nouvelle Fortune (2001), Wurfscheibe (2005), La Dancia (2006, 2007)

Winners

See also
 List of German flat horse races
 Recurring sporting events established in 1999 – this race is included under its original title, Frankfurter Stutenpreis.

References
 Racing Post / siegerlisten.com:
 1999, 2000, 2001, 2002, 2003, 

 galopp-sieger.de – Frankfurter Stutenpreis.
 horseracingintfed.com – International Federation of Horseracing Authorities – Herbst Stutenpreis (2012).
 pedigreequery.com – Frankfurter Stutenpreis – Frankfurt.

Middle distance horse races for fillies and mares
Horse races in Germany
Sport in Hanover